The Hiraodai Nature Observation Center is a gallery in Kokuraminami Ward, Kitakyushu City, Fukuoka Prefecture, Japan.

Exhibitions
The center explains about limestone and limestone caves formation.

Transportation
The center is accessible within walking distance southeast of Ishiharamachi Station of Kyushu Railway Company.

See also
 Geology of Japan

References

Art museums and galleries in Japan
Buildings and structures in Kitakyushu